Wang Danni (born 12 June 1993) is a former tennis player from China.

Wang has a career-high singles ranking by the Women's Tennis Association (WTA) of 685, reached on 15 July 2019. She also has a career-high WTA doubles ranking of 375, achieved on 3 December 2018. In her career, Wang won five doubles titles at tournaments of the ITF Women's Circuit.

She made her WTA Tour main-draw debut at the 2019 WTA Shenzhen Open in the doubles event, partnering Chen Jiahui.

ITF Circuit finals

Doubles (5–5)

References

External links
 
 

1993 births
Living people
Chinese female tennis players
21st-century Chinese women